Mundstock is a surname and may refer to:
 Marcos Mundstock (1942–2020), Argentinian comedian
 Pan Theodor Mundstock, title character in a novel by Ladislav Fuks